"A Streetcar Named Success" is an essay by Tennessee Williams about art and the artist's role in society. It is often included in paper editions of A Streetcar Named Desire.

A version of this essay first appeared in The New York Times on November 30, 1947, four days before the opening of A Streetcar Named Desire. Another version of this essay, titled "The Catastrophe of Success", is sometimes used as an introduction to The Glass Menagerie.

References
 

Essays by Tennessee Williams
1947 essays
Works originally published in The New York Times